Churston Ferrers Grammar School (also known as CFGS) is a selective coeducational Grammar School with Academy status, situated in the village of Galmpton in Torbay, South Devon, England. It is also a specialist Humanities College. Year 7 annual intake is approximately 130 pupils.

History
The school was founded in 1957 and accommodated around 350 pupils, drawn from the surrounding areas including those of the schools it replaced and as far afield as Totnes.
Its first headmaster, Donald W. Carter, was head of the Dartmouth Grammar School until its closing in 1957 when Churston opened. He led the school until 1972 when he retired.

In 2011, the school became an academy.

Location
The school is next to Churston railway station on the Paignton and Dartmouth Steam Railway. Its main playing fields are separated from the remainder of the school by the railway line and are currently accessible via a path under the railway line at the bottom of the main school playing field, or via Dartmouth road and the pavilions which were opened at the start of 2009.

Buildings
The school has occupied its current buildings since opening and was largely unchanged for the first half of its existence. When the school expanded in the late 1980s, a new classroom block and sports facility was added. Later, in 2001, the school expanded further with a Modern Foreign Languages block. In late September 2008, the school had a new block consisting of: a humanities classroom; a study centre; an IT room and two new departmental offices. This building was named 'The Cube' by the students in a poll from a selection of alternative names. For some time, there was a "maths hut", which was a temporary building that housed two Mathematics classrooms. This was eventually demolished in 2011 to make way for the new Sixth Form Centre which was completed in the summer of 2012. Also in 2016 a remodeling and extension of the Modern Foreign Languages block created a new section of the school for Art and Music.

Academic houses
There are currently five academic houses: Brunel, Christie, Gilbert, Singer and Thompson. All of the houses are named after notable individuals with ties to the local area, South Devon. Each house is represented by an individual crest and colour (Brunel - blue, Christie - green, Gilbert - red, Singer - purple, Thompson - yellow) and a head is appointed to ensure the running of the house system.

Each pupil is assigned to a house-based form upon induction and throughout the duration of the pupil's time at CFGS, will compete in both academic and sporting inter-house competitions as determined by an annual calendar of events; house points are subsequently awarded to each form group, contributing towards the yearly House Badge Competition. Students are organised into year groups which are managed by a Head of Year and an Assistant Head of Year.
Brunel House is named after the engineer Isambard Kingdom Brunel (1806–1859)
Christie House is named after the crime-writer Agatha Christie (1890–1976)
Gilbert House is named after the explorer Sir Humphrey Gilbert (c. 1539–1583)
Singer House is named after the sewing-machine pioneer Isaac Singer (1811–1875)
Thompson House is named after the novelist Flora Thompson (1876–1947)

Heads of the House System

Headteachers

Uniform
School uniform is required for pupils in years 7 to 11 but not the sixth form.

Boys
Boys' uniform consists of white shirt, navy V-necked sweatshirt with school badge, black or grey school trousers, navy school tie, black socks and black shoes.

In summer, boys can wear the uniform above or a white polo shirt with a school logo, and no tie.

Historically, boys' uniform consisted of a navy sweater and grey jacket with school badge in place of the current sweatshirt.

Girls
Girls' uniform consists of white shirt, navy skirt or trousers, navy V-necked sweatshirt or cotton cardigan or jumper with school badge, white ankle socks or black, navy or nude tights and black shoes with a low heel.

It was introduced in early 2012 that in summer, like the boys, girls could wear the polo shirts instead of the usual blouses.

Academic
The school features favourably in the school league tables results. There are currently 954 pupils in total, including 240 pupils in the sixth form that is heavily over-subscribed.

Churston Ferrers Grammar School is currently ranked "Outstanding" by Ofsted. The most recent Ofsted inspection was on 11 February 2009. Prior to 2009, Churston Ferrers Grammar School had been ranked Ofsted "Outstanding" on 26 April 2006.

Churston A-Level results:

2018 A2 Results:

Churston GCSE results:

The school has no present plans to offer sixth formers the option of either the International Baccalaureate or the Pre-U. It does however currently offer the AQA/English Baccalaureate to sixth form students.

Partnerships
Churston Ferrers Grammar School seeks to maintain and grow its local and international ties. CFGS has partnerships with several schools in Torbay, Europe (Erasmus Partnership Project with Portugal, Germany and Norway) and Peru.

With cooperation with GlobalEd, Churston Ferrers Grammar has developed its programme of Sustainable Development Education (ESD) with the goal of becoming a Sustainable School. This focus on sustainability has resulted in four of CFGS's feeder primaries pursuing a simultaneous programme of ESD development. Additionally, the ESD programme has seen CFGS establish links to Peruvian schools; in recent years this relationship has manifested itself in triannual trips, some as student exchanges. Various educational development projects conducted by CFGS pupils have made a worthwhile contribution to the partner pupils and in the UK, past activities have seen pupils design calendars in support of the on-going partnership.

Sports and extra-curricular

Basketball
Mr R Wooldridge (former England and GB Coach) was a teacher at CFGS in the mid 1990s and remains basketball coach for sundry year groups. Since the conception of the CFGS team, the school has twice been crowned National Champions.

Duke of Edinburgh's Award
The Duke of Edinburgh's Award at CFGS has grown increasingly in popularity over the last ten years and CFGS is a Directly Licensed Centre for DofE. Students have the choice to take part in DofE between Years 9 and 13 and approximately 200 students are currently doing either bronze, silver or gold level.

Other
Churston Ferrers Grammar School has historically had a debating presence both on and off site, from the organisation of hustings events for general elections to active participation in South West Academic Trust (SWAT) competitions. As of 2018, the Discussion and Debate club is led by Mr D Troake and Year 10 and Year 11 meet separately to the sixth form.

Students have in the recent past had available the option of attending a 'Listeners' programme that trained senior students in how to offer well-being support to younger students.

Notable former pupils

Following on the success of the 50th anniversary of the founding of the school, the Old Churstonians' Society was formed and is open to all past students and teachers.

Notable former students include:
 Kirk Brandon, musician 
 Ben Ayres, musician & Asian cultural ambassador
 E. H. H. Green (1958-2006), historian famed for his work on the history of the 20th-century Conservative Party 
 Andy Parsons, comedian and writer
 Adam Hart, scientist, broadcaster and author
 Giselle Ansley, Olympic field hockey gold medal athlete

References

External links
 Official website
 Old Churstonians Society

Grammar schools in Torbay
Academies in Torbay